Plagiopteron is a genus of flowering plants belonging to the family Celastraceae.

Its native range is Southeastern China to Indo-China.

Species:
 Plagiopteron suaveolens Griff.

References

Celastraceae
Celastrales genera